Les Ballets maliens is a Malian dance troupe created under the name 'Ensemble folklorique du Mali' in 1960, the day before the independence of Mali on September 22. By 1978, Les Ballets maliens had evolved into an artistic group specializing in traditional Malian dance, but open to the innovations of contemporary dance and choreography.

Repertoire
The dance of the possessed
The dance of Bamanan or Bambara masks
Madan
Sunu
Achagal : Dance tamashek
Kanaga : dance of Dogon masks
Dance of the horse
Dansa
Mabaji
Dance of Tambours
L’épopée Mandingue (Ballet)
Fura (Ballet)
Cigele (Ballet)
Bolon Sira
Sigi tè môgô-son
Lolon ni kolongala

Tours
1972 : USA (77 performances)
1976 : Festival des Arts Nègres at Lagos (Nigeria)
1985 : Festival Panafricain de la jeunesse at Tripoli (Libya)
1990 : International Festival of Music and Dance at Kuopio (Finland)
1990 : Festival international de danse of Fort de France (Martinique)
1997 : New Orleans International Jazz Festival (USA)
1998 : Participation at the last Exposition mondiale de Lisbonne, Portugal
1999 : Performance at the opening ceremony of the Sommet de l’OUA (Algeria)
2000 : Participation at the Festival Asilah (Morocco)
2000 : Participation at the Exposition universelle de 2000 at Hanover in Germany
2001 : Participation at the Festival of the 33rd Anniversary of Grande Jamahiriyya arabe libyenne at Tripoli (Libya)
2002 : Japan (Tokyo et Kyoto)

Awards
1963 : Gold medal of folklore at the Théâtre des Nations at Paris
1966 : First prize at the Festival des Arts Nègres of Dakar (Senegal)
1994 : Gold medal at the Afro-Arabe Fair in Tunisia
2002 : First prize at the Festival Africain de Folklore de Guinée FESTALOG

Instruments
All the instruments of malian traditional music are employed by les ballets : Djembé, Dundun, Balafon, N’Goni, Tamani, M'Polon, Buru, Yabara, Karignan, Daro (bell)

References

Folk dance companies
Malian dance
Performing groups established in 1960